Jurong Pier MRT station is a future elevated Mass Rapid Transit (MRT) station on the Jurong Region Line (JRL), located on the boundary of Boon Lay and Jurong East planning areas in Singapore. The station will be the southern terminus of the JRL mainline. Trains entering service at this station will terminate at Peng Kang Hill via Bahar Junction.

First announced in May 2018, the station is expected to be completed in 2029 along with Phase 3 of JRL.

History
On 9 May 2018, the Land Transport Authority (LTA) announced that Jurong Pier station would be part of the proposed JRL. The station will be constructed as part of Phase 3, consisting of 7 stations – a 4 station extension to this station from Boon Lay and a 3 station extension to Peng Kang Hill from Tawas. It was expected to be completed in 2028. However, the restrictions on construction due to the COVID-19 pandemic has led to delays, with the completion date pushed to 2029.

Construction is scheduled to start in the second quarter of 2021, with expected completion in 2029.

Station details
The station will serve the Jurong Region line (JRL) as the southern terminus of the main route, with the next station being Jurong Hill. The official station code will be JS12. Jurong Pier station will be situated along Jurong Pier Road, next to the Jurong Pier Circus and Jurong Pier Flyover. The station will have three entrances.

References

Mass Rapid Transit (Singapore) stations
Proposed railway stations in Singapore
Railway stations scheduled to open in 2029